Hitia'a O Te Ra is a commune of French Polynesia, an overseas territory of France in the Pacific Ocean. The commune of Hitia'a O Te Ra is located on the island of Tahiti, in the administrative subdivision of the Windward Islands, themselves part of the Society Islands. At the 2017 census it had a population of 10,033.

Hitia'a O Te Ra consists of the following associated communes:
 Hitia'a
 Maha'ena
 Papeno'o
 Tiarei

The administrative center of the commune is the settlement of Tiarei.

References

Communes of French Polynesia